2nd Kurasovo or Vtoroye Kurasovo is a rural locality in Pashkovsky Selsoviet Rural Settlement, Kursky District, Kursk Oblast, Russia. Population:

Geography 
The village is located 101 km from the Russia–Ukraine border, 9 km north of the district center – the town Kursk, and 4.5 km from the selsoviet center – Chaplygina.

 Climate
2nd Kurasovo has a warm-summer humid continental climate (Dfb in the Köppen climate classification).

Transport 
2nd Kurasovo is located 5 km from the federal route  Crimea Highway (a part of the European route ), 11 km from the road of intermunicipal significance  (Kursk – Iskra), 3 km from the road  (38N-379 – Chaplygina – Alyabyevo), on the road  (38N-381 – 1st Kurasovo), 12.5 km from the nearest railway halt Bukreyevka (railway line Oryol – Kursk).

The rural locality is situated 20 km from Kursk Vostochny Airport, 143 km from Belgorod International Airport and 215 km from Voronezh Peter the Great Airport.

References

Notes

Sources

Rural localities in Kursky District, Kursk Oblast